John Schoolcraft House is a historic home located at Guilderland in Albany County, New York.

Description
The house was built about 1835 and is a distinctive Gothic Revival style dwelling.  It features gingerbread vergeboards, pinnacles with crockets, lancet windows, and horizontal beaded siding.

The finials on the corners of the house are unique; the bases are made of wood, and the tips are of cast iron. The iron came from a foundry which Schoolcraft owned nearby. The house has 15 rooms with six fireplaces. The ballroom ceiling is decorated with plaster crown molding.

History 
The house was built for John L. Schoolcraft (1804-1860), U.S. Congressman and uncle of Henry Rowe Schoolcraft. Schoolcraft used the house as a summer home until he died in 1860 at age 52.

The house was listed on the National Register of Historic Places in 1982. The town purchased the property in 1994.

The town, together with Friends of the Schoolcraft Culture Center, renovated the house in stops and starts over a decade, as finances allowed. Around 2000, the exterior was renovated. The interior has been completely gutted and refitted with electricity, plumbing, heating, and climate controlled air conditioning, even a refrigerator and dishwasher.

A festive Holiday Event with over 200 guests was held in December 2014 to celebrate the restoration of the mansion. A portrait of Schoolcraft by artist Augusta Dudley was donated to the town and was expected to be installed in the house.  

The building has been home to several businesses over the years. In the early 1980's it was the home of Town Crier Becker Realty.

Gallery

See also
 National Register of Historic Places listings in Albany County, New York

References

External links
 Schoolcraft House at the Historical marker database

Houses on the National Register of Historic Places in New York (state)
Houses completed in 1835
Gothic Revival architecture in New York (state)
Houses in Albany County, New York
National Register of Historic Places in Albany County, New York